is the capital city of Miyagi Prefecture, the largest city in the Tōhoku region. , the city had a population of 1,091,407 in 525,828 households, and is one of Japan's 20 designated cities. The city was founded in 1600 by the daimyō Date Masamune.
In the summer, the Sendai Tanabata Festival, the largest Tanabata festival in Japan, is held.

On 11 March 2011, coastal areas of the city suffered catastrophic damage from a magnitude 9.0 offshore earthquake, which triggered a destructive tsunami.

History

Edo period 
Although the Sendai area was inhabited as early as 20,000 years ago, the history of Sendai as a city begins from 1600, when the daimyō Date Masamune relocated. Masamune was not happy with his previous stronghold, Iwadeyama, which was located in the northern portion of his territories and was difficult to access from Edo (modern-day Tokyo). Sendai was an ideal location, being in the centre of Masamune's newly defined territories, upon the major road from Edo. Tokugawa Ieyasu gave Masamune permission to build a new castle in Aobayama after the Battle of Sekigahara. The previous ruler of the Sendai area had used a castle located on Aobayama. Masamune changed the kanji to "", which later became "" (literally: "hermit/wizard" plus "platform/plateau" or figuratively, "hermit on a platform/high ground"). The character came from a Chinese poem that praised a palace created by the Emperor Wen of Han China (reigned 180–157 BCE), comparing it to a mythical palace in the Kunlun Mountains. Tradition says that Masamune chose this kanji so that the castle would prosper as long as a mountain inhabited by an immortal hermit.

Masamune ordered the construction of Sendai Castle in December 1600 and the construction of the surrounding castle town in 1601. The grid plan roads in modern-day central Sendai are based upon his plans.

Modern era 
The first railway line between Sendai and Tokyo, now the Tōhoku Main Line, opened in 1887, bringing the area within a day's travel from Tokyo for the first time in history. Tohoku Imperial University, the region's first university, was founded in Sendai in 1907 and became the first Japanese university to admit female students in 1913.

Sendai was incorporated as a city on 1 April 1889, with the post-Meiji restoration creation of the modern municipalities system following the abolition of the han system. The city grew, however, through seven annexations that occurred between 1928 and 1988. The city became a designated city on 1 April 1989; the city's population exceeded one million in 1999.

Sendai was considered to be one of Japan's greenest cities, mostly because of its great numbers of trees and plants. Sendai became known as The City of Trees before the Meiji Restoration, after the feudal Sendai Domain encouraged residents to plant trees in their gardens. As a result, many houses, temples, and shrines in central Sendai had , which were used as resources for wood and other everyday materials.

In 1925, the Senseki Line to Sendai Station became the first underground railway segment in Japan, preceding the opening of the Tokyo Metro Ginza Line (Asia's first subway line) by two years.

The 2nd Infantry Division was known as the "Sendai Division" as it was based in Sendai, and recruited locally. During the Second World War it was involved in many different campaigns, but one of the most important was the Battle of Guadalcanal. During the bombing of Sendai during World War II by the United States on 10 July 1945, much of the historic center of the city was burned, with 2,755 inhabitants killed and 11,933 houses destroyed in the city.

Postwar development
Following World War II, the city was rebuilt, and Sendai became a vital transportation and logistics hub for the Tōhoku region with the construction of major arteries such as the Tōhoku Expressway and Tōhoku Shinkansen.

In the early 1950s, the United States Army, Japan operated Camp Schimmelpfennig and Camp Sendai in the city.

Sendai has been subject to several major earthquakes in recent history, including the 1978 Miyagi earthquake, which was a catalyst for the development of Japan's current earthquake resistance standards, and the 2005 Miyagi earthquake. Most recently, the coastal area of Sendai, including Sendai Airport, was severely damaged in the 2011 Tōhoku earthquake and tsunami. The tsunami reportedly reached as far as Wakabayashi Ward Office,  from the coastline. Thousands were killed, and countless more were injured and/or made homeless. Sendai's port was heavily damaged and temporarily closed, reopening on 16 April 2011.

Geography
Sendai is located at lat. 38°16'05" north, long. 140°52'11" east. As a result, the city's geography is quite diverse. Eastern Sendai is a plains area, the center of the city is hilly, and western areas are mountainous. Unique among Japan's large coastal cities, Sendai's city core is built on a terrace at  elevation.

The basin consists of urban areas, paddy fields and forests. The mid and upstream areas have forests. The Natori River flows through the area and reaches Sendai Bay after .

The  flows  through Sendai. The river is well known as a symbol of Sendai, especially because it appears in the lyrics of Aoba-jō Koi-uta (青葉城恋唄; literally, The Aoba Castle Love Song), a popular song sung by Muneyuki Satō. Aoba Castle was built close to the river to use the river as a natural moat. The river frequently flooded until the 1950s, but dams and levees constructed in the 1960s and 1970s have made such floods rare.

Most mountains in Sendai are dormant volcanoes, much older than the more famous Mount Zaō and Naruko volcanoes in nearby municipalities. However, many hot springs can be found in the city, indicating hydrothermal activity. The Miyagi Oki earthquake occurs offshore Sendai once every 25 to 40 years. The 7.2 magnitude 2005 Miyagi earthquake, which occurred on August 16, 2005, had an epicenter close to the Miyagi Oki earthquake area. However, the Headquarters for Earthquake Research Promotion concluded that it was not the Miyagi Oki earthquake, saying "...the recent event is not thought to be this earthquake. This is because the magnitude of the earthquake was small, and the source area, which was estimated from the aftershock distribution and seismic waves, didn't cover the whole expected source region. Although, the recent event ruptured a part of the focal region of the expected earthquake." In 2011, the 9.0 magnitude 2011 Tōhoku earthquake occurred offshore Sendai, resulting in a devastating tsunami.

Wards
Sendai has five wards ("ku"), which were created when it became a designated city in 1989. The city consciously avoided names that included directions (e.g., north , center ) when it chose names for the new wards.

Cityscape

Climate
Sendai has a humid subtropical climate (Köppen Cfa), which features warm and wet summers, and cool and dry winters. Sendai summers are not as hot as Tokyo to the south, while the winters are much milder than Sapporo to the north, but retains significant seasonal differences in temperature and rainfall. Of Japan's prefectural capitals, Sendai experiences the fewest days of extreme temperatures (highs outside ) at 19.6 per year, compared to Tokyo's average of 49.

Winters are cool and relatively dry, with January temperatures averaging . Snowfall is much lower than cities on the Sea of Japan coast, such as Niigata and Tottori. Sendai's monsoon season usually begins in late April to early October, which is later than in most cities in Japan. During this season, cold winds from the Okhotsk air mass, called "Yamase", blow in and depress daytime highs.

Demographics 
In 2020 the city had an estimated population of 1,091,407 and a population density of 1,400 persons per km2. The city's total area was 786.30 km2. Most people in the city at this time lived in urban areas close to train and subway stations. The 2000 National Census revealed that 88.5% of the city's population (892,252 people) lived in a 129.69 km2 area, which is 16.6% of the city's total area. The population density in this area was 6,879.9 persons per km2, more than 5 times higher than the city's average population density at that time, 1,286.6 persons per km2. Approximately 10,000 people in Sendai were non-Japanese citizens.

Sendai had 525,828 households in 2020. The average household had approximately 2.07 members. The average household was becoming smaller every year, because single-member households were increasing. At this time Sendai had more people in their early 50s and in their 20s and early 30s than in other age groups. This is a result of the first and second baby booms in Japan, and university students. The average age in Sendai is 38.4, which makes the city one of the youngest major cities in Japan.

Governance 

Sendai's political system is similar to other cities in Japan, because the Local Autonomy Law makes all municipalities uniform in terms of organization and power. However, Sendai is a designated city, so it has the same jurisdiction as prefectures in some areas.

Sendai has a mayor-council form of government with a directly elected mayor and a unicameral city legislature. The Sendai City Assembly members are elected from 5 elective districts, which correspond to the city's 5 wards. The number of assembly members allocated to each ward is based upon population. As of May 2005, the city has 60 assembly members; 17 from Aoba Ward, 11 from Miyagino, 8 from Wakabayashi, 13 from Taihaku, and 11 from Izumi. The City Assembly elects an Assembly Chairperson and Vice Chairperson. Sendai has two vice mayors, who are not elected by the populace. Miyagi contributes 24 seats to the Miyagi Prefectural legislature. In terms of national politics, the city is divided between the Miyagi 1st district and the Miyagi 2nd district of the lower house of the Diet of Japan.

List of Mayors of Sendai (1889 to present)

Economy 

Sendai is the center of the Tōhoku region's economy, and is the base of the region's logistics and transportation. The GDP in Greater Sendai, Sendai Metropolitan Employment Area (1.6 million people), is US$61.7 billion in 2010. Sendai city by itself has a nominal GDP of approximately US$50 billion as of 2015. The city's economy heavily relies upon retail and services – the two industries provide approximately two thirds of the employment and close to half of the establishments.

Sendai is frequently called a branch-office economy, because very few major companies are headquartered in the city. Various authorities are cooperating to alleviate this problem, primarily by encouraging high-tech ventures from Tohoku University, which is well known for its science and engineering departments. There are also incentives for startups available from the prefectural government.

Tohoku Electric Power, a major regional supplier of electric power, has its headquarters in Sendai and also operates the Shin-Sendai Thermal Power Station located within the city.

Sendai's economic growth rate has stabilized since the 2011 Japan earthquake. The growth rate was only 0.4% in 2011 after the quake created economic turmoil in coastal areas. The year after, in 2012 the rate spiked to 10.4% after reconstruction efforts. It has since fallen to a closer trend to what is expected of 3.7% in 2013.

Tourism in 2016 attracted an estimated 2.229 million visitors to Sendai.

Education 

Sendai is sometimes called an  because the city has many universities relative to its population.

Universities located within Sendai include:
 Tohoku University
 Tohoku Gakuin University
 Miyagi University
 Miyagi Gakuin Women's University
 Miyagi University of Education
 Tohoku Fukushi University
 Tohoku Medical and Pharmaceutical University

Schools in the city include Tohoku International School.

Transport

Airport
The city is served by Sendai Airport (located in neighboring Natori), which has international flights to several countries, and the Port of Sendai. A rail link to Sendai began service on March 18, 2007.

Railway
JR East's Sendai Station is the main transport hub for the city. The station is served by seven JR lines and is a major station on the Tōhoku and Akita Shinkansen lines. An underground passage connects the station to the Sendai Subway. The subway has two lines— Namboku ("north-south") and Tōzai ("east-west") with a total of 30 stations. When completed in 2015, Yagiyama station became the highest-elevated subway station in the country at 136.4 meters.
  East Japan Railway Company (JR East)
Tōhoku Shinkansen: 
Tōhoku Main Line:  –  –  –  – 
Jōban Line:  –  – 
Senzan Line:  –  –  –  –  –  –  –  –  –  –  –  –  –  
Senseki Line:  –  –  –  –  –  –  –  –  – 
Sendai Subway (All stations)

Bus
In addition to the public bus system, a loop bus called Loople runs between tourism hotspots around the city.

Highways
The Tōhoku Expressway runs north–south through western Sendai, and is connected to other highways, such as the Sendai-Nambu Road, Sendai-Tobu Road, Sanriku Expressway (Sendai-Matsushima Road), and Sendai Hokubu Road.

Port
Ferries connecting Tomakomai and Nagoya stop at the Port of Sendai.

Culture

Streets

These are symbols of "The City of Trees". Jozenji-Dori has a promenade and a few sculptures. It is a place of relaxation. Aoba-Dori is the main business road in Sendai. Other major roads in the city include Hirose-Dori (ginkgo), and Higashi-Nibancho-Dori.

Festivals
The most famous festival in Sendai is Tanabata, which attracts more than 2 million visitors every year and is the largest Tanabata Festival in Japan. It is relatively quiet compared to other traditional Japanese festivals, because its main attractions are intricate Tanabata decorations.

The Aoba Matsuri Festival follows more typical Japanese festival traditions, with a mikoshi, floats, a samurai parade, and traditional dancing.

Local people burn their New Year decorations and pray for health in the new year during the Dontosai Festival, the oldest festival in Miyagi Prefecture.

Various contemporary festivals also take place in Sendai, such as the Jōzenji Streetjazz Festival, the Michinoku Yosakoi Festival, and the Sendai Pageant of Starlight. The Jōzenji Streetjazz Festival is one of the largest amateur music festivals in Japan. It began as a jazz festival in 1991, but soon began to accept applications from all genres. The Michinoku Yosakoi festival is a dance festival, derived from the Yosakoi Festival that takes place in Kōchi. Trees in downtown Sendai are decorated with lights during the Sendai Pageant of Starlights. The event provided the idea for the Festival of Lights annually held in Riverside, Sendai's sister city. In 2005, the streets were lit up with one million miniature bulbs.

Specialties and crafts

Sendai is the origin of several foods, including gyūtan (beef tongue, usually grilled), hiyashi chūka (cold Chinese noodles), and robatayaki (Japanese-style barbecue). However, robatayaki was later introduced to Kushiro, which developed and popularized the dish. As a result, many people believe Kushiro is the origin of Robatayaki. Zundamochi (ずんだ餅, mochi balls with sweet, bright green edamame paste), and sasakamaboko (笹かまぼこ, kamaboko shaped like bamboo leaves) are also considered to be Sendai specialties. Sendai is also known for good sashimi, sushi, and sake. This is because Sendai is near several major fishing ports, such as Kesennuma, Ishinomaki, and Shiogama, and the fact that Miyagi Prefecture is a major producer of rice. There are many ramen restaurants in Sendai, and the area is known for a particular spicy miso ramen. Also, Sendai station offers the most types of ekiben of any station in Japan. In autumn, many people organise Imonikai, a sort of picnic by the river which involves making a potato stew called Imoni.

Many crafts from Sendai were originally created under the influence of the Date family during the Edo period. Examples are Sendai Hira, a hand woven silk fabric, Tsutsumiyaki pottery, and Yanagiu Washi paper. However, some crafts, such as umoregi zaiku (crafts created from fossil wood) were developed by low-ranking samurai who needed side jobs to survive. Kokeshi dolls were popularized by hot spring resorts that sold them as gifts. Some relatively recent developments include Sendai Tsuishu lacquerware and Tamamushinuri lacquerware, both of which were developed after the Meiji Restoration.

Sendai was also known for its production of Tansu, clothing drawers made from wood with elaborate ironwork.

Sites of interest

Sendai is home to historical sites related to the Date clan. The ruins of Sendai Castle are close to downtown on Aobayama, which also gives a panoramic view of the city. The Zuihōden is the tomb of Date Masamune and is home to artifacts related to the Date family. It is on a hill called Kyogamine, which is the traditional resting place for Date family members. In Aoba-ku, the Ōsaki Hachiman-gū shaden, built in 1607 by Date Masamune, is designated a National Treasure. Mutsu Kokubun-ji Yakushidō is the provincial temple of Mutsu Province.

Newer historical sites include the former home of Doi Bansui, a famous lyricist, and a monument at Sendai City Museum that commemorates the Chinese writer Lu Xun. Another statue of Lu Xun can be found in the Tohoku University Katahira Campus, where Lu Xun studied medical science. Older historical sites include the Tōmizuka Tomb, a tomb that dates back to the late 4th century or early 5th century, and the Tomizawa Preserved Forest site, where the excavated remains of a Stone Age human settlement (Upper Palaeolithic – roughly 20,000 years ago) have been protected by a large museum structure, built in 1996. The nearby Site of Tagajō was an important early fort and administrative centre.

Museums

Sendai City Museum displays artifacts related to the Date family and the history of Sendai. Date Masamune's famous suit of armour and artifacts related to Hasekura Tsunenaga's visit to Rome (National Treasures of Japan) are sometimes on display.

The Sendai Umino-Mori Aquarium, which opened in 2015 as a successor to the Marinepia Matsushima Aquarium, is focusing on raising the Sanriku fish, the blue sharks.

The Miyagi Museum of Art is Sendai's largest art museum. A total of 24 sculptures have been installed in public locations in Sendai through its 'City of Sculptures' project.

The Sendai City Tomizawa Site Museum in the southern part of the city preserves a fossilized forest where the remains of human habitation from 20,000 years ago can be seen.

The Sendai City War Reconstruction Memorial Hall is dedicated to remembering the air raid of July 1945 in which most of Sendai was destroyed.

Other museums include the 3M Sendai City Science Museum, Sendai Literature Museum and Tohoku University's Museum of Natural History.

Natural sites

Western Sendai is home to many sites of natural beauty, many of them found around Akiu Onsen and Sakunami, which are hot spring resorts. Sites around the Akiu area include the Akiu Great Falls, sometimes counted as one of Japan's three great waterfalls, and the Rairai Gorge, known for its autumn colours. The Futakuchi Gorge contains waterfalls that have been designated as natural monuments and the Banji Cliffs, an example of columnar basalt.

The Sakunami area is also known for its natural environment, with cherry blossoms in the spring, and autumnal colours. The nearby Hōmei Shijuhachi Taki Falls is the name of waterfalls found in the higher reaches of the Hirose River. The origin of the name "Hōmei" (鳳鳴, "Chinese phoenix cry") is said to come from ancient local inhabitants' claim that the sound of the waterfalls was similar to the legendary bird's call.

The Tatsunokuchi Gorge offers a view of a petrified wood next to the Otamaya-bashi bridge. Nishi Park and Tsutsujigaoka Park are appreciated for their cherry blossom in the spring. The Hirose River and the Gamo tideland are home to diverse wildlife.

Matsushima, which is one of the Three Views of Japan, is near Sendai, in Matsushima.

Other sites
Sendai Mediatheque is a multipurpose facility that houses the city library, galleries, and film studio facilities open for use by the general public. The building was designed by Toyo Ito and is known for its innovative architecture.

The AER Building, Miyagi Prefectural Office, and SS30 Building have observation decks that offer panoramic views. The Sendai Trust Tower is the tallest building in Tohoku and Hokkaido.

Uminomori Aquarium opened in July 2015, built near the Port of Sendai.

The statue was built during Japan's bubble economy by a now defunct company. It was once the tallest statue in the world.

Sendai also contains a Peace Pagoda, built by Nipponzan-Myōhōji-Daisanga in 1974.

Religion

Shinto
Shinto shrines in Sendai include Miyagiken Gokoku Shrine, Tsubonuma Hachiman Shrine, Futahashira Shrine, and Sendai Tōshōgū, a memorial shrine of Tokugawa Ieyasu.

Catholicism
The Catholic Church has been associated with Sendai since 1613, the year in which Date Masamune, daimyō of Sendai, built a galleon to send an embassy to the Pope in Rome headed by Hasekura Tsunenaga. Although the embassy was successful in its aim of establishing relations with the Holy See, Masamune's plans were frustrated by the suppression of Christianity in Japan. The Diocese of Sendai (previously the Diocese of Hakodate) was established in 1891, only two years after the promulgation of a new constitution guaranteeing freedom of religion in Japan, in 1889. The Bishop of Sendai currently oversees the four northern prefectures of Miyagi, Fukushima, Iwate and Aomori, serving 11,152 Catholics in 56 parishes. Mototerakoji, the Cathedral of the diocese, is located a few blocks north of Sendai Station.

Sports

Although the Lotte Orions briefly used Sendai as a temporary home for the franchise from 1973 to 1977, the city was largely ignored by professional sports until 1994. In that year, the Tohoku Electric Power football team was changed into a club team, Brummel Sendai, with the goal of eventually being promoted into the J.League. The team achieved this goal when the J. League expanded in 1999 with the creation of a second division. The name of the team was simultaneously changed to Vegalta Sendai. Currently the city also host semi-professional outfit Sony Sendai FC.

In 2005, the number of professional sports teams based in Sendai suddenly increased to three. The Tohoku Rakuten Golden Eagles was introduced as a new Pacific League baseball franchise after widely publicized turmoil involving the merger of the Kintetsu Buffaloes and the Orix Blue Wave developed into the first strike in Nippon Professional Baseball. Additionally, the Japan Basketball League, which began its inaugural season in November 2005, included the Sendai 89ers among its first six teams.

Annual sporting events include the Sendai Cup, an international football tournament for U-18 teams, and the Sendai International Half Marathon. In 2006 of the Sendai International half marathon, Mizuki Noguchi, who won the women's marathon gold medal at the 2004 Athens Olympic Games, took part in and won the race in a surprising course record.

Various sporting venues can be found in Sendai, such as Hitomebore Stadium Miyagi (venue of 2002 FIFA World Cup), Yurtec Stadium Sendai, Miyagi Baseball Stadium, Sendai City Gymnasium, Sendai Athletic Stadium, Shellcom Sendai and Sendai Hi-Land Raceway. The city is also known as the origin of figure skating in Japan, and both 2006 Olympic gold medalist Shizuka Arakawa and two-time Olympic gold medalist (2014, 2018) Yuzuru Hanyu trained in Sendai during their childhood. Tohoku Fukushi University and Sendai Ikuei Gakuen High School are well known for their strong sports programs, the latter for baseball.

In 2006, Sendai hosted some games of the 2006 FIBA World Championship. Before that, the city had some experience at hosting international basketball events such as the 1994 and 2004 editions of the FIBA Women's Asia Cup. Sendai Girls' Pro Wrestling is a joshi wrestling company based in sendai.

Baseball
Tohoku Rakuten Golden Eagles (Pa.League)

Basketball
Sendai 89ers (B.League)

Football
Vegalta Sendai (J.League)
MyNavi Sendai（WE.League）

Futsal
Voscuore Sendai（F.League）

Volleyball
Ligare Sendai（V.League）

International relations

Twin towns – sister cities

Sendai has a long history of international relationships. Its affiliation with Riverside, California, on March 9, 1957, is the second oldest sister city partnership in Japan.

Sendai is twinned with:
Acapulco, Guerrero, Mexico (since October 1973)
Bilbao, Basque Country,  Spain (since October 1970)
Changchun, Jilin, China (since October 1980)
Dallas, Texas, United States (since August 1997)
Gwangju, South Korea (since April 2002)
Minsk, Belarus (since April 1973)
Rennes, Brittany,  France (since September 1967)
Riverside, California, United States (since March 1957)

Friendship cities
Sendai also cooperates with:
Oulu, North Ostrobothnia,  Finland (since November 2005)
Tainan, Taiwan (since January 2006)

International events
The Sendai International Music Competition takes place every three years, welcoming participants from around the world.

Sendai has hosted international conferences about disaster management, as is recognized as a model city for disaster risk prevention.

Notable people

 Akitoshi Saito, Japanese professional wrestler who currently works for Pro Wrestling Noah (Currently lives in Nagoya, Aichi)
 Hirohiko Araki, manga artist; creator of JoJo's Bizarre Adventure. The fictional city of Morioh that appears in JoJo's Bizarre Adventure is based on Sendai.
 Miho Arakawa, voice actress
 Chris Broad, British YouTuber based in Sendai
 Mika Doi, voice actress
 Mimori Yusa, singer-songwriter
 Yuzuru Hanyu, figure skater and two time Olympic champion (2014-2018)
 Eugen Herrigel lectured at Tohoku Imperial University from 1924 until 1929
 Sharla Hinskens, Canadian YouTuber based in Sendai
 Kanata Hongō, actor and model
 Karen Iwata, member of girl-group AKB48
 Monkey Majik, band, formed and based in Sendai
 Hikaru Minegishi, footballer
 Yūsei Oda, voice actor
 Minene Sakurano, manga artist; creator of Mamotte Shugogetten
 Kimi Sato, composer
 Somei Satoh, composer
 Satomi Satō, voice actress
 Shizuka Arakawa, figure skater and Olympic Champion (2006)
 Yoko Kanno, composer
 Ayumi Ishida, member of girl-group Morning Musume '17
 Ai Fukuhara, table tennis player
 Tomokazu Harimoto, table tennis player
 Shun Sato, figure skater and 2019 Junior Grand Prix Final Champion
 Dash Chisako Wrestler in sendai girls pro wrestling
 Sendai Sachiko former wrestler in sendai girls pro wrestling

References

External links

Official Website 
Sendai traveling information

 
Cities in Miyagi Prefecture
Populated places established in 1600
Port settlements in Japan
Populated coastal places in Japan
Cities designated by government ordinance of Japan